Veronica macrantha, the large-flowered hebe, is a species of flowering plant in the family Plantaginaceae, native to New Zealand. As its synonym Hebe macrantha it has gained the Royal Horticultural Society's Award of Garden Merit.

References

macrantha
Endemic flora of New Zealand
Flora of the North Island
Flora of the South Island
Plants described in 1864